The following is a list of all the All That cast members and performers. The show ran from 1994–2005 originally and returned in 2019, with three series runs total. The first run ran for six seasons, from 1994 to 2000. However, the show was put on a hiatus for a TV season after the sixth season. While the show was on a break, Nickelodeon aired a "Best Of" season to fill in time, featuring the Season 4 cast. A year later, the show was relaunched for a second run and ran for four seasons, from 2002 to 2005. Thirteen years later, the show was revived again, from 2019 to 2020.

List of cast members

Cast timeline
<onlyinclude>

References

All That cast members
All That cast members
All That cast members
All That cast members
All That cast members
All That cast members
All That cast members
All That cast members
Cast members
All That
All That
All That cast members

All That cast members